Chet Miksza (November 28, 1930 – October 29, 1975) was a centre for the Hamilton Tiger-Cats of the Canadian Football League from 1952-1968.

External links
Obituary

1930 births
1975 deaths
Canadian football offensive linemen
Hamilton Tiger-Cats players
Montreal Alouettes players
Sportspeople from Hamilton, Ontario
Players of Canadian football from Ontario